Ali: Fear Eats the Soul is a 1974 West German drama film written and directed by Rainer Werner Fassbinder, starring Brigitte Mira and El Hedi ben Salem. The film won the International Federation of Film Critics award for best in-competition movie and the Prize of the Ecumenical Jury at the 1974 Cannes Film Festival. It is considered to be one of Fassbinder's most powerful works and is hailed by many as a masterpiece.

The film revolves around the romance that develops between Emmi, an elderly German woman, and Ali, a Moroccan migrant worker in postwar West Germany.

Plot
The film takes place an unspecified number of months after the Munich Massacre in West Germany. Emmi, a 60-year-old window cleaner and widow, enters a bar, driven in by the rain and wanting to listen to the music being played inside. A woman in the bar tauntingly suggests Ali, a Moroccan Gastarbeiter (guest worker) in his late thirties, ask Emmi to dance, to which Emmi accepts. After they dance, they develop a friendship and Ali follows Emmi home, staying at her apartment for the night. After more interaction, they start to fall in love and Ali continues to live with Emmi. Emmi decides to visit her children to introduce them to Ali; daughter Krista and her tyrannical son-in-law Eugen; Eugen thinks she is losing her sanity and Krista thinks that her mother – who has been a widow for years – is fantasising.

Their relationship is threatened when the landlord's son, who has been sent on the assumption that Emmi has taken in a lodger, tells Emmi that subletting is against Emmi's tenancy agreement, and that Ali must leave within a day. Fearful of losing Ali, Emmi claims that she and Ali are planning to marry. After the landlord's son apologises for the misapprehension and leaves, Emmi speaks to Ali and apologises for having invented the idea of her marrying him, but is surprised by Ali when he says that it is an excellent idea. The film then shows them in a civil court, married.

Their marriage is looked upon negatively by those who live near them, which include apartment tenants and shopkeepers. Emmi is shunned by her work colleagues, and Ali faces discrimination at every turn. When Emmi invites her three grown children and son-in-law to meet Ali, they openly reject him. One of Emmi's sons smashes in her TV set in anger, her other son declares she must have lost her sanity, calls Emmi a "whore". Before the four leave Emmi's apartment, her daughter mentions it a "pigsty".

Emmi's sadness towards this rejection washes away as her optimism resurfaces and she decides that she and Ali should take a long holiday together to escape the discrimination, convinced that upon their return, they will have been missed and will be welcomed back. After their return, they face less discrimination, but only because neighbouring tenants and shopkeepers see the gain in treating Emmi better, not because they have outgrown their prejudices.

Wanting to get back with her old friends after their apparent renewed respect, Emmi begins to neglect Ali and adopt some of their attitudes toward him. She becomes more strict, ordering him to do more things. When co-workers visit and remark on how surprisingly clean he is and comment on his muscles, she shows him off as if he were an object. This causes Ali to leave, to which Emmi remarks to her friends of his "mood swings" and that his attitude must be due to his "foreigner mentality". Ali seeks comfort in bar maid Barbara, who it is suggested he had a relationship with prior to meeting Emmi. Ali returns to Barbara on another day, spending the night with her. Emmi visits Ali at work, where he pretends he doesn't know her; his workmates make fun of her age, calling her his "Moroccan grandmother", to which Ali does not intervene.

When it seems as if the relationship is beyond repair, Emmi goes back to the bar where they first met to meet with Ali and has the bar maid put the same song on the jukebox that led to their dance in the beginning of the film. They decide to dance together, and, while dancing, Emmi emphasizes that she knows she is old and that he is free to come and go, but she tells him that when they are together, they must be nice to each other. He agrees, and they declare their love for each other. Ali then collapses in Emmi's arms from what turns out to be a burst stomach ulcer. The film then shows Emmi with Ali in the hospital, where a doctor tells her the illness is common among foreign workers because of the stress they face in everyday life; the doctor then adds that Ali will have surgery to remove the ulcer, though he will probably be back in six months with another ulcer. Emmi declares that she will do everything in her power to prevent this and holds Ali's hand.

Cast
 Brigitte Mira – Emmi Kurowski
 El Hedi ben Salem – Ali
 Barbara Valentin – Barbara
 Irm Hermann – Krista
 Rainer Werner Fassbinder – Eugen
 Karl Scheydt – Albert Kurowski
 Marquard Bohm – Gruber
 Walter Sedlmayr – Angermayer
 Doris Mattes – Mrs. Angermeyer (as Doris Mathes)
 Lilo Pempeit – Mrs. Münchmeyer
 Gusti Kreissl – Paula
 Margit Symo – Hedwig
 Elisabeth Bertram – Frieda
 Helga Ballhaus – Yolanda
 Elma Karlowa – Mrs. Kargus
 Anita Bucher – Mrs. Ellis
 Katharina Herberg – Woman in Bar

Production
The film was shot in just under two weeks, and was planned as an exercise in film-making for Fassbinder, to fill in the time in his schedule between the work on two other films, Martha and Effi Briest.

Ali is played by El Hedi ben Salem, who was Fassbinder's partner at the time. Fassbinder has a cameo appearance as Emmi's son in law. Irm Hermann, who plays Emmi's daughter Krista, had a turbulent relationship with Fassbinder in real life, having been quoted as saying of Fassbinder, "He couldn't conceive of my refusing him, and he tried everything. He almost beat me to death on the streets of Bochum ....". And Fassbinder grew up under some of the domestic effects of immigrant prejudice, given that his mother immigrated back to Germany from Poland after the Soviet Occupation and Fassbinder grew up in a turbulent and eventually divorcing household where immigrating relatives stayed with them.

The original German title Angst essen Seele auf is deliberately grammatically incorrect, translating literally as "Fear eat soul up."  The correct German form would be "Angst isst die Seele auf" – which (without the definite article "die") became the title of a related 2002 short film also starring Mira. The title is one of the things Ali tells Emmi. As an immigrant, he speaks in what can be referred to as  "broken German" consistently throughout the film. The line of dialogue he utters is simply "Fear eat soul up." Since Ali's poor German grammar is translated literally in the film's English subtitles, the subtitles for Ali's dialogue are similarly riddled with grammatical errors.

Ali is in part an homage to the films of Douglas Sirk, in particular Imitation of Life (1959) and All That Heaven Allows (1955). The most overt homage is the scene in which Emmi's son kicks in the television (an important symbol in All That Heaven Allows) after finding out that his mother has married a north African.

Themes and symbolism
"Fear eats the soul", which is one of the things Ali says while talking with Emmi early in the movie, becomes almost literal later on, when it turns out that Ali has a stomach ulcer and is hospitalised. The characters are also often shown on screen in exaggerated ways; characters are shown far away from the camera to emphasise how distant from society Emmi and Ali feel, while their apartment is shot in a claustrophobic manner, to symbolise the fear they feel in their relationship and everyday life. Spectatorship in the film embodies social oppression against marginalized individuals, yet ironically, such distancing diminishes when the neighbourhood sees a utilitarian need in Emmi and Ali, as "productive and consuming bodies".

Release
Ali: Fear Eats the Soul was released in West Germany on March 5, 1974. The film has been released by the Criterion Collection as a region 1 DVD with English subtitles. The Blu-Ray contains the contents of both disks of the 2003 DVD release, which include interviews with actress Brigitte Mira and editor Thea Eymes. A BBC documentary based on famous German directors of the era, which compares Fassbinder, Werner Herzog, and Wim Wenders, is also included.

Reception

Upon release
The film gained critical acclaim upon its release, with the film's tone and Fassbinder's direction being singled out as highlights. Writing for The Chicago Sun-Times, Roger Ebert gave the film 4 out of 4 stars, writing: "[Fassbinder] nudges us to get outside the movie and look at it as absurd, as black humor, as [a] comment on these people so hopelessly trapped in their dreary surroundings and by their fates...Is [Fassbinder] sometimes being deliberately funny? I’m sure of it. His style and tone are so adamant that audiences sometimes just sit in silence, uncertain of the right response. With some films, that indicates the director's loss of control over tone. With Fassbinder, it seems to be the response he wants." Gene Moskowitz of Variety gave it a similarly positive review, calling the film "Not showy for exploitation, too observant and cool for robust hypoing". Vincent Canby of The New York Times dissented somewhat, calling it a "courageous attempt" and praising Mira and Salem's performances, while criticizing the "posterlike blandness" of the movie. Despite the acclaim his movie received, Fassbinder stated that he thought it was only the eighth best movie he made.

Modern reception
The film has continued to receive positive reviews, with Mira and Salem's acting being praised as a highlight. On Rotten Tomatoes, the film has an approval rating of 100%, based on 36 reviews, with an average rating of 9.3/10. The website's critical consensus reads "Regarded as one of the high-water marks in German New Wave cinema of the 1970s, Ali: Fear Eats the Soul is at once an intense portrayal of a relationship and a tribute to one of Rainer Werner Fassbinder's film heroes, Douglas Sirk."

Martin Scorsese included it on a list of "39 Essential Foreign Films for a Young Filmmaker."

Writing for The New York Times, Alex Abramovich calls Ali "The most thought-provoking, and beautiful, of [Fassbinder's] films" Richard Brody of The New Yorker praised the direction, writing "Fassbinder uses the camera with a precise, novelistic touch", and he praised Fassbinder's tributes to other films, writing Fassbinder "didn't just make use of prior forms, he quoted them, and derived from them the ironies implicit in his melodramatic styles." Writing for The Guardian, Peter Bradshaw calls Mira and Salem's performance "superb", and "The most purely lovable characters I have ever seen on a movie screen". Re-reviewing the movie for Great Movies, Roger Ebert calls the film "very powerful" and ends his review by writing "Ali: Fear Eats the Soul might sound like improbable, contrived soap opera. It doesn't play that way."

Accolades

References

Sources
 
 Laura Cottingham. Angst essen Seele auf. London: British Film Institute, 2005.

Further reading
 Jim's Reviews overview

External links
 
 
 
 Ali: Fear Eats the Soul: One Love, Two Oppressions an essay by Chris Fujiwara at the Criterion Collection

1974 drama films
West German films
German drama films
1970s German-language films
Films about immigration to Germany
Films about race and ethnicity
Films directed by Rainer Werner Fassbinder
Adultery in films
Films set in Munich
Films set in West Germany
Films shot in Munich
Films about racism
1970s German films